Donald Sawyer is a film director, currently residing in Westfield, New Jersey.  He is best known for directing the controversial 2009 documentary, 'The Eyes Have Frozen Open: The Fall of the Kroner'. The film chronicling the financial crisis in Iceland met harsh reviews at the 2010 Boulder International Film Festival. Critics have cited its depiction of certain British banks as being succubi on the economy of Iceland as "over-the-top and defamatory."

References

People from Westfield, New Jersey
Living people
Year of birth missing (living people)
Place of birth missing (living people)
Film directors from New Jersey